The 2017 Laser Radial World Championships were held in Medemblik, the Netherlands 19–26 August 2017.

Results

Men's Laser Radial

Women's Laser Radial

Gold fleet

Silver fleet

References

Laser Radial World Championships
Laser Radial World Championships
Sailing competitions in the Netherlands
2017 in Dutch sport